Drink Me is the first studio album by English Britpop band Salad, released in May 1995, a year after their compilation of singles and B-sides Singles Bar.

Recording

The album was recorded at Britannia Row studios and was produced by Mark Freegard who had previously worked with the Breeders. Singer and keyboard player van der Vlugt describes the recording process as having been difficult and the band needing to "dig deep".

Artwork

All photographs (including the cover and rear sleeve) were taken by documentary photographer Martin Parr who accompanied the band on a ferry trip. The CD booklet devotes a page to the lyrics of each track, together with an accompanying photograph.

Release
The album was released in May 1995 through Island Records, shortly after the release of the single "Motorbike to Heaven" which peaked at No. 42 on the charts and in the process became the band's highest charting single. Prior to this, the tracks "Your Ma" and "Drink the Elixir" had been released as singles, the former as a triple A-side together with "Plank" and "Open". The final single released from the album was "Granite Statue".

Reception

Drink Me reached number 16 in the UK album charts. A contemporary review in Select by Roy Wilkinson reserved particular praise for the first two tracks, describing them as "invigorating blasts".

Track listing
Writing credits per booklet.

Personnel
Personnel per booklet.

Salad
 Marijne van der Vlugt – vocals, keyboards
 Paul Kennedy – guitar, vocals
 Rob Wakeman – drums, samples
 Pete Brown – bass

Production
 Mark Freegard – producer, mixing
 Martin Parr – photographs
 DesignPig – design

Chart performance

References

Salad (band) albums
1995 albums
Island Records albums